William Polk Dobson (1793–1846) was a prominent 19th century North Carolina politician in Surry County.

Genealogy: Father William Carlye Dobson; Mother Jane Knox Polk - First cousin of President James Knox Polk 
Siblings - Martha Polk Hughes
Son - Edward Moore Dobson

Born in Rockford, North Carolina, Dobson was a state senator, representing Surry County in the state senate in Raleigh in 1818–1819, 1827, 1830–1834, 1836, and 1842. The current county seat of Surry County, Dobson, is named for him. Dobson is buried in a family cemetery near the Rockford.

Notes

Decendents; Henry H. Dobson, Charles Smith Dobson, Charles D. Dobson Sr., Charles D. Dobson Jr., Jacob D. Dobson, Jacob D. Dobson Jr., Rose Dobson, Shelby B. Dobson,

1793 births
1846 deaths
People from Rockford, North Carolina
North Carolina state senators
Polk family
19th-century American politicians